Shidali (Şiźäle) is a rural locality (a village) in Andreyevsky Selsoviet, Ilishevsky District, Bashkortostan, Russia. The population was 48 as of 2010. There are 3 streets.

Geography 
Shidali is located 35 km north of Verkhneyarkeyevo (the district's administrative centre) by road. Marino is the nearest rural locality.

References 

Rural localities in Ilishevsky District